Charles Owen Hobaugh (born November 5, 1961, in Bar Harbor, Maine) is a former NASA astronaut and a retired U.S. Marine Corps officer. He has had three spaceflights, all of which were Space Shuttle missions to the International Space Station, lasting between 10 and 13 days.

Hobaugh was selected to be an astronaut in 1996, and his first spaceflight was STS-104, for which he was designated pilot of Space Shuttle Atlantis. That mission took place in July 2001, less than a year after the space station received its first long-duration crew. His most recent spaceflight was in November 2009, STS-129 on Atlantis again; this time he was designated commander. In total, he has logged 36 days in space.

Education
In 1980 he graduated from North Ridgeville High School, North Ridgeville, Ohio. In 1984 he received a Bachelor of Science degree in Aerospace Engineering from the United States Naval Academy. From January 1993 to August 1994 he attended the University of Tennessee Space Institute. He is a member of the U.S. Naval Academy Alumni Association.

Awards and honors
Hobaugh has received several awards and honors, including those listed below.
 U.S. Naval Academy Distinguished Graduate
 Joe Foss Award for Advanced Jet Training
 U.S. Naval Test Pilot School Distinguished Graduate
 Strike/Flight Air Medal
 Navy and Marine Corps Achievement Medal
 Combat Action Ribbon
 Navy Unit Commendation

Military career
Hobaugh received his commission as a Second Lieutenant in the United States Marine Corps upon graduation from the U.S. Naval Academy in May 1984. He graduated from The Basic School in December 1984. After a six-month temporary assignment at the Naval Air Systems Command, he reported to Naval Aviation Training Command and was designated a Naval Aviator in February 1987. He then reported to VMAT-203 for initial AV-8B Harrier training. While assigned to VMA-331, he attended Marine Aviation Warfare and Tactics Instructor Course and was subsequently assigned as the Squadron Weapons and Tactics Instructor. Hobaugh was selected for U.S. Naval Test Pilot School and began the course in June 1991.

After graduation in June 1992, he was assigned to the Strike Aircraft Test Directorate as an AV-8 Project Officer and as the ASTOVL/JAST/JSF Program Officer. While there, he flew the AV-8B, YAV-8B (VSRA) and A-7E. In July 1994, he went back to the Naval Test Pilot School as an instructor in the Systems Department, where he flew the F-18, T-2 Buckeye, U-6A and gliders. Hobaugh was assigned to the U.S. Naval Test Pilot School when he was selected for the astronaut program. In September 2010 he retired from the U.S. Marine Corps.

Hobaugh has logged over 5,000 flight hours in more than 40 different aircraft and has over 200 V/STOL shipboard landings.

NASA career
Selected by NASA in April 1996, Hobaugh reported to the Johnson Space Center in August 1996. He completed two years of training and evaluation, and was qualified for flight assignment as a pilot. Hobaugh was initially assigned technical duties in the Astronaut Office Spacecraft Systems/Operations Branch. Projects included Landing and Rollout, evaluator in the Shuttle Avionics Integration Laboratory (SAIL), Advanced Projects, Multifunction Electronics Display Enhancements, Advanced and Upgrade, Rendezvous and Close Proximity Operations and Visiting Vehicles prior to his first flight assignment. Most recently, he served as Capsule Communicator, working in the Mission Control Center as the voice to the crew.

Hobaugh was the reentry and landing CAPCOM for the STS-107 mission, on which the Space Shuttle Columbia was destroyed on reentry.  He spoke the words "Columbia, Houston. UHF Comm Check" several times after Mission Control had lost contact with Columbia.

STS-104
Hobaugh flew as the pilot of STS-104 (July 12–24, 2001). This mission was the tenth mission to the International Space Station (ISS). During the 13-day flight the crew conducted joint operations with the Expedition 2 crew and performed three spacewalks to install the Quest Joint Airlock and to outfit it with four high-pressure gas tanks. The mission was accomplished in 200 Earth orbits, traveling 5.3 million miles in 306 hours and 35 minutes.

STS-118
He flew as pilot on STS-118 in August 2007 for 13 days.

STS-129
Hobaugh served as commander on the STS-129 mission aboard  for 10 days in November 2009.

Civilian career
Hobaugh was hired by FedEx in 2011.

Personal life
Hobaugh is married to the former Corinna Lynn Leaman of East Petersburg, Pennsylvania; they have four children. He enjoys weight lifting, volleyball, boating, water skiing, snow skiing, soccer, bicycling, running, rowing and competing in triathlons.

See also

 STS-104
 STS-118
 STS-129

References

External links
 Spacefacts biography of Charles O. Hobaugh

1961 births
Living people
United States Marine Corps astronauts
People from Bar Harbor, Maine
United States Naval Academy alumni
United States Naval Test Pilot School alumni
United States Marine Corps colonels
United States Naval Aviators
United States Marine Corps personnel of the Gulf War
Recipients of the Air Medal
Space Shuttle program astronauts